Sørlaguna is a lagoon on the island of Jan Mayen. It is the largest lake of Jan Mayen, and is located in the central part of the island, near the bay of Rekvedbukta.

References

Landforms of Jan Mayen
Lagoons of Norway